Tenmile Creek is a stream in the U.S. state of Washington. It is a tributary of the Snake River.

Tenmile Creek was named from its distance,  over pioneer roads from Lewiston, Idaho.

See also
List of rivers of Washington

References

Rivers of Asotin County, Washington
Rivers of Washington (state)